Un Jour Parfait (French for "a perfect day") is the second solo album by the Stranglers' bassist  Jean-Jacques Burnel, released on 23 September 1988 by Epic Records. The album was aimed at the French market and its release limited to certain territories, but was available in the UK as an import. All songs were written in French, except "Garden of Eden".

Background
In a 1992 interview, Burnel explained: "with this I wanted to do something with French sounds and sensibilities". Pat Gilbert of Record Collector magazine described the album as a "collection of melodic pop songs ... including a number of Latin-tinged tracks which faintly echoed the light, whimsical strains of the Stranglers' Feline album." In his book Peaches: A Chronicle of The Stranglers 1974-1990, Robert Endeacott described it as having "a gentle Euro disco vibe mixed in with a strong sense of melancholy, soaked in majestic keyboards."

The track "Weekend" is a reworking of "Les Dames de Rochefort", a 1988 song by Belgian band Glacier Georges.

The album was reissued on CD in 1994 by Stranglers Information Service and again in 1998 by Eastworld Recordings. Both reissues featured new cover artwork and bonus tracks.

Track listing
All lyrics and music written by Jean-Jacques Burnel, except where noted.

1998 CD reissue bonus track
This reissue includes the same 3 bonus tracks, and in the same order, as the 1994 reissue.

Personnel
Adapted from the album liner notes.
Musicians
Jean-Jacques Burnel - bass, guitar, programming, drums
Dave Greenfield - keyboards
Glaciers George - keyboards on "Weekend"
Alex Gifford - saxophone
Chris Lawrence - trombone
Jason Votier - trumpet
Technical
Jean-Jacques Burnel - producer, engineer
Owen Morris - engineer
Dave Greenfield - engineer
Bang Hai Ja - cover painting
Jean-Yves Legras - photography
Grant Louden - graphics
Jean-Luke Epstein - graphics
Simon J. Webb - cover design (1994 and 1998 reissues)

References

External links
Worldwide Discography - JJ Burnel page

Jean-Jacques Burnel albums
1988 albums
Epic Records albums
French-language albums